Einar Gerhardsens plass is a town square between the three government buildings S Block, R4, and Høyblokka in Regjeringskvartalet in Oslo. The street Grubbegata passes through the square.

The square was named in 1997 after Prime Minister Einar Gerhardsen.

Images

References

Squares in Oslo